Peri-Khan Sofieva  (1884 – 1953) was the first Muslim woman elected to office.

Biography
Sofiyeva was born in 1884 in the Georgian town of Karajala, then part of the Georgian region of Tiflis Governorate, in the Russian Empire. She was the only girl in a family of eight. At the time of the Russian Empire, Sofia was the head of her brothers, thus gaining popularity. With the loan taken from a bank, she opened an orphanage in the village.

Political career

Independent Georgia 
After the February 1917 Revolution, the transition from the South Caucasus began with a reform of the local governments. On 26 May 1918, Georgia declared its independence. In local elections later in the year, Sofiyeva was elected to be a councillor in Karajala. Although Sofiyeva was an active person, very little is known about her life.

Invasion of the Soviet Union 
According to Rashgan Sofieva, the wife of Peri-Khan Sofieva's nephew, Sofiyeva hated the Bolsheviks and the Soviet government. Because of the Great Purge, she walked around with her old Mauser C96 pistol, after eight brothers were executed and buried in one of the common graves because they came from a rich family and were considered traitors.

Death 
Sofiyeva died in 1953, victim of a heart attack after hearing of the detention of one of her nephews.

External links 
İlk müsəlman, azərbaycanlı qadın deputat - "Kişi Pəri" kimdir? (Biography in BBC Azerbaijan)

References

1884 births
1953 deaths
Georgian Azerbaijanis
Politicians of the Russian Empire
Democratic Republic of Georgia
20th-century women politicians from Georgia (country)
20th-century politicians from Georgia (country)
People from Tiflis Governorate